Simona Dimitrova (Bulgarian: Симона Димитрова, born 17 July 1994 in Plovdiv) is a Bulgarian female volleyball player. She is part of the Bulgaria women's national volleyball team. 
She competed at the 2015 FIVB Volleyball Women's U23 World Championship, 2015 European Games in Baku, and at the 2015 FIVB World Grand Prix. 

At club level she played for TFSE in 2015.

References

External links 
 Player info FIVB
 Player info, CEV

1994 births
Living people
Bulgarian women's volleyball players
Wing spikers
European Games competitors for Bulgaria
Volleyball players at the 2015 European Games